"Arabesque" is a song by British rock band Coldplay from their eighth studio album Everyday Life. It was released on 24 October 2019, along with the single "Orphans", and appears on the first side of the album Sunrise. It features vocals by Belgian singer Stromae and horn sections by Femi Kuti and his band. The song was written by all band members, Karnivool guitarist Drew Goddard, Femi Kuti and Stromae, while production was handled by The Dream Team. It is the second release by the band to feature profanity ("same fucking blood" appears in the final verses of the song), with the first being the remix of "Lost!" featuring Jay-Z, although this marks the first instance of Chris Martin swearing.

Background and promotion
On 24 October 2019, the band announced the release (on the same day) of the songs "Arabesque" and "Orphans" as a dual release and as the first singles off Everyday Life. In anticipation of the new era, the band set up a countdown leading up to the release a few hours in advance. Arabesque was performed live on BBC Radio 1 as part of the Annie Mac Show on 27 November 2019.

Critical reception 
"Arabesque" received critical acclaim. Dan Stubbs of NME stated that the song "finds Coldplay in less familiar territory than 'Orphans', in that it has French vocals and a sax freakout that shifts the song into a modern jazz piece that couldn’t be more in tune with the nu-jazz zeitgeist if it tried." Writing for Under the Radar, Christopher Roberts named "Arabesque" the best song of the week, stating that it is "one of the most interesting songs the band has released in years". Christian Eede of The Quietus wrote that "Coldplay are digging up their roots and toying with the base-level fabric of their sound with an attacking, seductive piece that storms trumpet-first", and named "Arabesque" one of the best tracks of October 2019. Muzikalia placed it on their unranked "Best Songs of 2019" list.

Personnel
Credits adapted from the "Orphans / Arabesque" liner notes.

Coldplay
 Guy Berryman – bass guitar, hand clap, writer
 Will Champion – drums, keyboards, percussion, vocals, writer
 Jonny Buckland – guitar, writer
 Chris Martin – guitar, hand clap, vocals, writer
Additional musicians
 Omorinmade Anikulapo-Kuti – alto saxophone
 Babatunde Ankra – trombone
 Drew Goddard – guitar, writer
 Daniel Green – keyboards
 Samir Joubran – guitar
 Wissam Joubran – guitar
 Adnan Joubran – guitar
 Femi Kuti – horn, writer
 Made Kuti – orchestrionics
 Ayoola Magbagbeola – tenor saxophone
 Gbenga Ogundeji – trumpet
 Bill Rahko – keyboards
 Davide Rossi – strings
 Rik Simpson – keyboards
 Stromae – vocals, writer

Production
 Chris Allgood – assistant mastering
 Lionel Capouillez – additional engineer
 Michael Freeman – mixing
 Daniel Green – producer, programmer
 Adnan Joubran – additional engineer
 Emily Lazar – mastering
 Bill Rahko – producer, programmer
 Lance Robinson – additional engineer
 Davide Rossi – additional engineer
 Jacques Du Plessis - additional engineer
 Gavin Flax - additional engineer
 Rik Simpson – producer, programmer
 Mark "Spike" Stent – mixing
 Matt Wolach – assistant mixing

Charts

Release history

References

2019 singles
2019 songs
Coldplay songs
Parlophone singles
Songs written by Chris Martin
Songs written by Guy Berryman
Songs written by Jonny Buckland
Songs written by Will Champion
Experimental rock songs
Jazz fusion songs